Koh Se-kai (born 1934 in Changhua County) is a Taiwanese historian, politician, and diplomat. He is an important leader of the Taiwan independence movement. In 2004, Koh was appointed to be the Republic of China’s top representative to Japan. By June 2008, Koh had retired.

References

1934 births
20th-century Taiwanese historians
Taiwan independence activists
Affiliated Senior High School of National Taiwan Normal University alumni
University of Tokyo alumni
Waseda University alumni
Living people
Politicians of the Republic of China on Taiwan from Changhua County
Taiwan Independence Party chairpersons
Representatives of Taiwan to Japan
Taiwanese people of Hoklo descent